Bala is a commune located in Mehedinți County, Oltenia, Romania. It is composed of fifteen villages: Bala, Bala de Sus, Brateșul, Brativoești, Câmpu Mare, Cârșu, Comănești, Crainici, Dâlma, Iupca, Molani, Rudina, Runcușoru, Sărdănești and Vidimirești. It is situated in the historical region of Oltenia.

References

Communes in Mehedinți County
Localities in Oltenia